The Special Economic Zones in Russia are established by the Russian government to attract foreign direct investment. The privileges of special economic zones last for 49 years, and offer their residents a special legal status resulting in a number of tax and customs preferences.

Russia has eighteen federal special economic zones (SEZs) and several regional projects. Federal SEZs in Russia are regulated by Federal Law # 116 FZ issued on July 22, 2005.

There are MNCs among investors to Russia's SEZ, such as Yokohama, Cisco, Isuzu, Air Liquide, Bekaert, Rockwool and many others.

History
Federal Law # 116 FZ was  issued on July 22, 2005 to regulate SEZs. 

Open joint-stock company OSJC "Special Economic Zones" was founded in 2006 to accumulate and implement world's best practices in developing and managing SEZ and promote Foreign direct investment (FDI) in the Russian economy. It is fully owned and funded by the Russian state. It managed fifteen to-be federal SEZs.

As of March 2010, Russia's federal SEZs host 207 investors from eighteen countries.

List of SEZ
List of special economic zones in Russia as of 2017:

Industrial Production
 Alabuga Special Economic Zone
 Kulibin Special Economic Zone
 Lipetsk
 Lyudinovo
 Moglino
 Titanium Valley
 Togliatti

Technology and development
 Dubna
 Innopolis Special Economic Zone (the city of Innopolis)
 St. Petersburg
 Tomsk
 Zelenograd

Tourist and recreational
 Altai Valley
 Baikal Gates
 Baikal Haven
 Russky Island
 The Turquoise Katun

Logistics
 Murmansk
 Sovetskaya Gavan
 Ulyanovsk Vostochny

References

External links
 RusSEZ 

 
Tax avoidance